Vnukovo, formally Vnukovo Andrei Tupolev International Airport (named after Andrei Tupolev) , is a dual-runway international airport located in Vnukovo District,  southwest of the centre of Moscow, Russia. It is one of the four major airports that serve Moscow, along with Domodedovo, Sheremetyevo, and Zhukovsky. In 2019, the airport handled 24.01 million passengers, representing an increase of 12% compared to the previous year. It is the tenth-busiest airport in Europe.

History

Vnukovo is Moscow's oldest operating airport. It was opened and used for military operations during the Second World War, but became a civilian facility after the war. Its construction was approved by the Soviet government in 1937, because the older Khodynka Aerodrome (located much closer to the city centre, but closed by the 1980s) was becoming overloaded. Vnukovo was built by several thousand inmates of Likovlag, a Gulag concentration camp created specifically for this purpose, and opened on 1 July 1941. During the Great Patriotic War, it was used as a military airbase; passenger services started after the war.

On 15 September 1956, the Tupolev Tu-104 jetliner made its first passenger flight from Moscow Vnukovo to Irkutsk via Omsk.

On 4 November 1957, a plane carrying Romanian Workers' Party officials, including the most prominent politicians of Communist Romania (Gheorghe Gheorghiu-Dej, Chivu Stoica, Alexandru Moghioroș, Ştefan Voitec, Nicolae Ceauşescu, Leonte Răutu, and Grigore Preoteasa), was involved in an accident at Vnukovo Airport. Preoteasa, who was minister of foreign affairs at the time, was killed, as was the aircraft's crew. Several others were seriously injured.

The first passenger flights of the IL-18 (Moscow to Alma-Ata on 20 April 1956) and Tu-114 (Moscow to Khabarovsk on 24 April 1961) were also made from Vnukovo Airport. In 1980, Vnukovo was expanded because of the 22nd Summer Olympic Games. In 1993, Vnukovo Airport became a joint-stock company.

A massive reconstruction and strategic development programme commenced at Vnukovo International in late 2003, following the transfer by the federal government of the controlling stake in the airport to the government of Moscow.

As part of the Airport Strategic Development Plan, these projects were completed between 2003 and 2005:

 April 2004: New Terminal B was opened. The terminal currently handles international passengers, but in the future, it will be converted to handle domestic flights or to fulfill any other dedicated functions to be determined at a later date. The terminal's total floor space offering stands at 80,000 m2 (861,000 sq ft), allowing for an annual passenger throughput capacity of four million.
 August 2005: Vnukovo's Aeroexpress rail link to Kiyevsky Rail Terminal was opened.
 December 2010: New Terminal A was opened.
 Summer 2016: All flights served by Terminal B were transferred into Terminal A, and Terminal B was closed.

Vnukovo is Europe's busiest airport for international flights by larger private planes.

Location and capacity
Of the three Moscow airports, Vnukovo is the highest ( above sea level), so in case of fog, it has frequently served as an alternative airport.

The joint runway capacity is 60 aircraft movements per hour. Runway 24 is mostly used for departures, while Runway 01 is for landings.

The airport has two passenger terminals (Terminal A and Terminal B), one general aviation terminal (for charter and business flights), one cargo terminal, and 60 aircraft stands.

The airport can handle a maximum of 10,100 passengers per hour, and 4,000 people are employed there. In 2013, the airport handled almost 11.18 million passengers, representing a 15.3% increase compared to 2012. In February 2014 the airport handled 722,500 passengers, an increase of 23.8% compared to February 2013, partly attributed to expansion by Utair.

Vnukovo Airport is equipped with a VIP hall, which is used by many political leaders and important people visiting Russia. The Russian President also uses Vnukovo's VIP facility. The Tupolev airliner rework facility is located at the edge of the airport, and major overhaul and modification programmes are carried out in several large aircraft hangars. On the northern perimeter of the airport, the government VIP transport wing is located, operating head-of-state flights for high-ranking government officials. Thus, the airport is occasionally closed for regular flights when VIP flights arrive or depart.

Further expansion
The prospective development programme was intended to last until 2015, and was aimed at transforming Vnukovo International into a highly competitive air transportation hub of international significance – one that would offer a comprehensive range of quality services to both its passengers and its tenant carriers.

This will open up many opportunities for the tenant airlines to expand and improve the quality of their customer service at the airport, and ensure the introduction of international-quality service and comfort overall. The sprawling terminal building will be located on the site of the existing domestic passenger terminal, and will also serve as a springboard for the subsequent development of the entire adjacent landside area both next to the terminal and further out towards Vnukovo Settlement. The oldest of the Vnukovo passenger terminals, dating back to 1941, will be demolished by the time construction of the new one goes ahead (it was started to be dismantled in November 2005). The existing domestic Terminal 2, built in the late 1970s, will continue in operation until its eventual demolition during the final phase of construction and replacement with the new terminal.

The existing taxiways are to be extended as part of the expansion and new ones will also be built, along with a brand new control tower, an extension to the cargo terminal, and a multistory car park.

Terminals
Terminal A is the only terminal used both for domestic and international flights. Terminals B and D are out of service as of October 2017.

Airlines and destinations

Statistics

Annual traffic

Ground transportation

Rail

Aeroexpress direct line connects Vnukovo Airport and Kiyevsky Rail Terminal in Moscow city centre was opened in August 2005. One-way journey costs 500 rubles (420 rubles for online purchase) (as of November 2017). The journey takes 35 minutes.

Bus
Moscow city can be reached by the municipal Mosgortrans bus lines: 611 - reaches two consecutive stations (Troparyovo and Yugo-Zapadnaya) of Moscow Metro Sokolnicheskaya Line, 611k reaches only the nearest Salaryevo station of Moscow Metro Sokolnicheskaya Line, but avoids the often congested crossing with MKAD road; nearby Rumyantsevo station is only easily accessible on the way to the airport, not away from it. The fare is 50 rubles (as of September, 2016; eq. to 0.77 US$), travel time 20-35 min. by schedule. Private marshrutka line 45 also serves this direction. One-way journey costs 150 rubles (as of February 2016; eq. to 2 US$). Due to heavy traffic in Moscow, journey takes 15 minutes to 1 hour.

Taxi
Several taxi services to Moscow city and suburbs are available at the airport. Uber, Gett, Yandex.Taxi and local transportation network companies offer flat rate trips to anywhere in Moscow.

Metro 

The Government of Moscow, as a part of metro line 8 (Kalininsko-Solntsevskaya) expansion, plans to open a Metro station to serve the airport. It is scheduled to be completed in 2023 as a new terminus station from Rasskazovka.

Other facilities
Previously Vnukovo Airlines had its head office at the airport.

Ownership
The airport is co-owned by the Russian state and Russian businessman Vitaly Vantsev and his partners. In March 2018, Qatar Airways announced plans to buy a 25 percent stake in Vnukovo Airport.

Accidents and incidents
 On 21 December 1943, a Lisunov Li-2 crashed while on a training flight due to a defect in the left rear fuel tank.
 On 4 March 1944, Douglas C-47A crashed into a Bell P-39Q Airacobra on the ground while attempting to execute a go-around.
 On 5 November 1946, Douglas C-47B crashed after the crew decided to go-around some 300 m (980 ft) past a landing sign. The aircraft was flying low and engine power was sharply increased. The aircraft went into a steep climb, lost speed and crashed 600 m (2,000 ft) from the landing sign.
 On 5 November 1946, an Aeroflot-Lithuania Lisunov Li-2 crashed due to fuel exhaustion after repeated approach attempts while in a holding pattern.
 On 1 July 1947, an Aeroflot Ilyushin Il-12 crashed after the left engine failed on takeoff, causing a loss of airspeed.
 On 29 March 1951, an Aeroflot Ilyushin Il-12P crashed during which the right propeller struck the top of a radio tower.
 On 14 June 1957, an Ilyushin Il-14P operating LOT Polish Airlines Flight 232 crashed after the crew did not follow instruction to use an instrument approach.
 On 4 November 1957, an Ilyushin Il-14P belonging to the Romanian Government crashed on approach in the fog.
 On 2 September 1959, an Ilyushin Il-18B suffered significant structural damage, forcing it to make an emergency landing.  The aircraft was written off.
 On 23 October 1959, Aeroflot Flight 200 crashed in a forest on approach and was destroyed by fire, killing 28 of the 29 people aboard.
 On 26 August 1969, an Aeroflot Ilyushin Il-18B crashed after the crew forgot to lower the landing gear, killing 16 passengers.
 On 10 October 1971, Aeroflot Flight 773 crashed shortly after takeoff when an explosive device on board detonated, killing all 25 people aboard.
 On 2 June 1980, a Soviet Air Force Antonov An-22A suffered an in-flight fire and crashed short of the runway.
 On 16 January 2010, Utair Boeing 737-500 VQ-BAC departed the runway on landing and was substantially damaged when the nosewheel collapsed.
 On 29 December 2012, a Red Wings TU-204 overran the runway, hitting the M3 highway. The aircraft burst into flames and broke into three pieces, with dashcam footage showing a car being hit by the debris. Five people were killed.
 On 20 October 2014, a Dassault Falcon 50 collided on take-off with a snow plow, killing all four people on board, including the CEO of Total S.A. oil and gas company Christophe de Margerie.
 In 2021, a young male passenger murdered a female airline staff member at the airport. They were said to have arranged a rendezvous after a flight. He fled and was caught after a few days on the run.

See also
List of the busiest airports in Russia
List of the busiest airports in Europe
List of the busiest airports in the former USSR

References

External links

 Vnukovo International Airport official website 
 Historical weather records for Vnukovo
 International airport Vnukovo

Airports built in the Soviet Union
Airports established in 1941
Airports in Moscow
 
1941 establishments in the Soviet Union